Maurice Fenaille (12 June 1855 – 11 December 1937) was a French businessman and pioneer in the petroleum industry. He was also a major amateur art historian, collector and patron.

References 

1855 births
1937 deaths
French art historians
19th-century French philanthropists
French art collectors
French male non-fiction writers
20th-century French philanthropists